Munki Brain is an album by pop-punk band The Queers.

Release
On October 13, 2006, the band's upcoming album was titled Munki Brain. On December 29, 2006, "Houston We Have a Problem" was posted on Asian Man Records' Myspace account; it was followed two days later by "I Think She's Starting to Like Me". On January 14, 2007, the album's track listing and cover artwork was posted online. In January and February 2007, went on a tour of the US with support from the Heart Attacks, Teenage Rehab, the Riptides and the Mansfields. On January 23, Munki Brain was made available for streaming, before being released by Asian Man Records on February 6. Following this, they went on an East Coast tour in April 2007, a West Coast tour with the Methadones, the Manges, and Black Tie Bombers in May and June 2007, and then a European trek with Marky Ramone in July 2007. In May and June 2008, the band toured the US as part of the Asian Man Records Tour with various labelmates, which included an appearance at the Insubordination Fest. They appeared at the 2009 South by Southwest music conference.

Track listing
Writing credits adapted from the album's liner notes.

Personnel
Credits adapted from the album's liner notes.

The Queers
 Joe Queer (Joe King) – guitar, lead vocals
 Phillip Hill – bass guitar, backing vocals
 Lurch Nobody – drums (all tracks except "I Think She's Starting to Like Me" and "Brian Wilson")

Additional performers
 Lisa Marr – vocals
 Mike Nolte – guitar, keyboard, vocals, photographs
 Nathan Bice – drums on "Brian Wilson"
 Dan Lumley – drums on "I Think She's Starting to Like Me"
 Vanesa Toquero – keyboards on "Duke Kahanamoku" and “I Think She’s Starting to Like Me”
 Mass Giorgini – backing vocals and tenor saxophone on "Duke Kahanamoku" and backing vocals on “I Think She’s Starting to Like Me”
 Peter "Blackie" Black – lead guitar on "Whatever Happened to Philthy Phil?"
 Rick Miller – lead guitar on "Duke Kahanamoku"

Production
 Mass Giorgini – producer, audio engineer
 Jorge Orillac – assistant audio engineer

Artwork
 Tony Dovi – photographs, album design, layout

References

The Queers albums
2007 albums
Asian Man Records albums